Jayavarman I, also called Protégé of Victory, is considered to be the last ruler of the united Chenla, the predecessor polity of the Khmer Empire.

Biography 
He ruled from approximately 657 until around 681. Over the course of his reign, and that of his predecessors Bhavavarman II and Candravarman, the Khmer kings power was consolidated in the areas previously controlled by the Funan’s culture. However, Jayavarman left no male heirs, which led to the division of Cambodia.

Inscriptions associated with his reign are found at Tuol Kok Prah, Wat Prei Val, Prah Kuha Luon, Wat Kdei Ang, Wat Baray, and Tuol Nak Ta Bak Ka. His palace was located at Purandarapura. He was the great-grandson of Isanavarman I. Jayavarman I's daughter, Queen Jayadevi, succeeded him as queen regnant.

See also
 Jayavarman II - considered by most to be the first king of the Khmer Angkor kingdom, ruling at the beginning of the 9th century.

References

Further reading
 Coedes, G. (1962). "The Making of South-east Asia." London: Cox & Wyman Ltd.

7th-century Cambodian monarchs
Hindu monarchs
Chenla